The  is a Roman Catholic minor basilica dedicated to the Immaculate Conception located in Ouidah, Benin.  The basilica is under the circumscription of the Archdiocese of Cotonou.  The basilica was dedicated on November 9, 1989.

References

External links
Basilica website (French)
Diocese of Cotonou (French)

Basilica churches in Africa
Roman Catholic churches in Benin